The list of ship launches in 1697 includes a chronological list of some ships launched in 1697.


References

1697
Ship launches